Chkalovskaya is a station on the Avtozavodskaya line of the Nizhny Novgorod Metro. It opened on 20 November 1985 and was one of six initial stations of the Metro.

Chkalovskaya is named for Ulitsa Chkalova which intersects at Ulitsa Oktyabrskoy Revolyutsii. The street is named for the test pilot Valery Chkalov.

References

External links
 Station page on official Metro website

Nizhny Novgorod Metro stations
Railway stations in Russia opened in 1985
1985 establishments in the Soviet Union
Railway stations located underground in Russia